Humite is a mineral found in the volcanically ejected masses of Vesuvius. It was first described in 1813 and named for Abraham Hume (1749–1838).

See also

 Jerrygibbsite
 Chondrodite
 Clinohumite
 Alleghanyite

References

External links

Magnesium minerals
Iron(II) minerals
Gemstones
Humite group
Orthorhombic minerals
Minerals in space group 62